Vladimir Feofanovich Takhtamyshev (1890s–1935) was a Ukrainian Greek participant in the Russian Civil War, as part of the Makhnovist movement.

Biography
Vladimir Feofanovich Takhtamyshev was born in the 1890s, in the Greek village of Velyka Novosilka. 

After the signing of the Treaty of Brest-Litovsk in 1918, Takhtamyshev formed a Greek detachment in the village of Stary Kermenchik, and led the fight against the Austro-German invaders. The detachment operated in the area of the villages of Malaya Yanisol, Cherdakly, Kellerovka, Makedonovka, Sartana.

On 21 February the bolshevik Pavel Dybenko arrived in Pologi. There was an inspection and a meeting with the command staff, where Dybenko read out the order of the commander of the Kharkov direction Skachko: “The troops included in the group entrusted to me have been ordered to be brought into a division, and therefore I order: from units under the command of comrades Dybenko, Makhno and Hryhoriv to form one rifle division, which in the future will be called the Zadneprovskaya Ukrainian Soviet Division."

After that, Takhtamyshev was appointed to the political committee of the 9th Greek Regiment of the Zadneprovsk division. Takhtamyshev was the only commander that was not elected, but appointed by the command. On 19 March Takhtamyshev took part in the liberation of Mariupol from the White Army. After the liberation of the city, Dybenko awarded the 9th Regiment with the Order of the Red Banner.

At the end of June, the Makhnovist regiments occupied a part of the front, stretching from Berdyansk to the village of Pokrovskoye. Under his command were 2,000 Red Army soldiers, of which 1,200 were without rifles. At the end of 1919, Takhtamyshev's unarmed detachment joined the 14th Army and remained in it.

After the end of the civil war, Takhtamyshev settled in Mariupol, where he headed the construction of a fish cannery and became its first director. In 1935 he died from illness.

References

Bibliography

Greek anarchists
Ukrainian anarchists
Ukrainian people of Greek descent
1935 deaths
People from Donetsk Oblast